Armich Kola (also Romanized as Ārmīch Kolā) is a village in Pazevar Rural District, Rudbast District, Babolsar County, Mazandaran Province, Iran. At the 2006 census, its population was 805, in 221 families.

References 

Populated places in Babolsar County